Hendrik Snoek a former German show jumper who later became a businessman. Snoek was heir to a supermarket fortune.  He was kidnapped on 3 November 1976 and held for a DM 5,000,000 ransom. He was discovered by a lorry driver, tied up under a motorway bridge, after the ransom was paid by his father.  A considerable amount of the ransom was eventually recovered. He was a founder of the Westphalian Horse Museum in Münster.

Show jumping
Snoek won the 1972 Hickstead Derby on Shirokko. He was a reserve at the 1976 Summer Olympics for West Germany. He won the R.D.S. Dublin Grand Prix in 1984 riding the chestnut mare Palma Nova.

References 

Living people
German male equestrians
German show jumping riders
Year of birth missing (living people)